Ellsworth Raymond "Bumpy" Johnson (October 31, 1905 – July 7, 1968) was an American crime boss in the Harlem neighborhood of New York City.

Early life
Ellsworth Raymond "Bumpy" Johnson was born in Charleston, South Carolina, on October 31, 1905, to Margaret Moultrie and William Johnson. When he was 10, his older brother Willie was accused of killing a white man. Afraid of a possible lynch mob, his parents mortgaged their tiny home to raise money to send Willie up north to live with relatives. Johnson's nickname "Bumpy" is derived from a bump on the back of his head. As Johnson grew older, his parents worried about his short temper and insolence towards whites, and in 1919 he was sent to live with his older sister Mabel in Harlem. Johnson dropped out of high school and began working unruly jobs. Gangster William Hewett started to notice him. Johnson then began working for him, beginning his life of crime.

Career
Johnson was an associate of numbers queen Madame Stephanie St. Clair. He became St Clair's principal lieutenant in the 1930s. Johnson and St. Clair aimed to start a war against New York mob boss Dutch Schultz. The fight resulted in more than 40 murders and several kidnappings. Eventually the fight on their end was lost, ending with a deal for Johnson.

In 1952, Johnson's activities were reported in the celebrity people section of Jet. That same year, Johnson was sentenced to 15 years in prison for a drug conspiracy conviction related to heroin. Two years later, Jet reported in its crime section that Johnson began his sentence after losing an appeal. He served the majority of that sentence at Alcatraz Prison in San Francisco Bay, California as inmate No. 1117, and was released in 1963 on parole.

Johnson was arrested more than 40 times and served two prison terms for narcotics-related charges. In December 1965, Johnson staged a sit-down strike in a police station, refusing to leave, as a protest against their continued surveillance. He was charged with "refusal to leave a police station" but was acquitted by a judge.

Death
Johnson was under a federal indictment for drug conspiracy when he died of congestive heart failure on July 7, 1968, at the age of 62. He was at Wells Restaurant in Harlem shortly before 2 a.m., and the waitress had just served him coffee, a chicken leg, and hominy grits, when he fell over clutching his chest. He is buried in Woodlawn Cemetery in The Bronx, New York City.

Personal life 
Bumpy Johnson married Mayme Hatcher in October 1948, just six months after their first meeting. Johnson had two daughters, Ruthie and Elease, the latter of whom was from another relationship. His wife died in May 2009 at the age of 94.

In popular culture

Film
 In the 1971 film Shaft and its 1973 sequel Shaft's Big Score!, Moses Gunn portrays "Bumpy Jonas", a character based upon Johnson.
 In the 1972 film Come Back Charleston Blue, the title character is loosely based on Bumpy Johnson, a criminal who is looked upon as a positive role model among the people.
 In the 1979 film Escape from Alcatraz, Paul Benjamin plays a character based on Bumpy Johnson, "English".
 In the 1984 film The Cotton Club, Laurence Fishburne plays a character based on Bumpy Johnson, "Bumpy Rhodes".
 In the 1997 film Hoodlum, Johnson is again portrayed by Fishburne.
 In the 1999 film Life, musician Rick James plays a Harlem gangster, "Spanky Johnson", who was loosely inspired by Bumpy Johnson.
 In the 2007 film American Gangster, Johnson is portrayed by Clarence Williams III

Television
 In an episode of Unsolved Mysteries, it is reported that Johnson allegedly helped the three escapees of Alcatraz get to the shores of San Francisco. It is said that he arranged for a boat to pick the three men up out of the bay. The boat then dropped the escapees off at Pier 13 in San Francisco's Hunters Point District.
 In the second episode of the third season of HBO's The Wire, "All Due Respect", Bumpy is mentioned just before Tree (dealer for Cheese Wagstaff) kills Jelly over a dog fight in which Cheese's dog lost. Three low-level gangsters discuss an incident when Bumpy allegedly attacked a police station single-handedly. This is expanded upon in Richard Price's audio commentary for that episode.
 Cable network Epix premiered the crime drama television series Godfather of Harlem in Fall 2019. Forest Whitaker plays Johnson. The series was created by executive producers Markuann Smith, Chris Brancato and Paul Eckstein, who are producing with ABC Signature Studios.

Music
 Prodigy titled his first full release after his release from prison in 2011 The Ellsworth Bumpy Johnson EP, which was followed by The Bumpy Johnson Album.
 Central Cee released an EP in 2022 titled No More Leaks which featured a track titled "Bumpy Johnson".

References

External links

 Harlem Godfather: The Rap on My Husband, Ellsworth "Bumpy" Johnson - by Mayme Hatcher Johnson
 
 Infinite MagaZine   Documentary
 
 

1905 births
1968 deaths
African-American gangsters
American gangsters
American drug traffickers
American crime bosses
American bootleggers
Burials at Woodlawn Cemetery (Bronx, New York)
Criminals from South Carolina
Criminals from Manhattan
Genovese crime family
Inmates of Alcatraz Federal Penitentiary
Gangsters from New York City
People from Charleston, South Carolina
People from Harlem
Prohibition-era gangsters